Thomas William Dobson JP (9 November 1853 – 13 May 1935) was a coal merchant and  Liberal Member of Parliament (MP) representing Plymouth from 1906 to 1910.

Background
Dobson was born the son of Thomas and Maria Dobson of Hackney. He was educated at Congregational School, Hackney. In 1875 he married Caroline Jane Potterveld of Hackney. He settled in Park Hill Road, Croydon.

Professional career
Dobson was the senior partner in the firm of Godson & Dobson, coal and timber merchants of Croydon.

Political career
Dobson was a member of Croydon School Board from 1879 to 1885. He was a member of Croydon Council from 1885 to 1905. He served as a Justice of the peace in Croydon. He was Liberal candidate for the Plymouth division of Devon at the 1906 General Election. He introduced and carried in Parliament, Willett's Daylight Saving Bill. He did not seek re-election at Plymouth at the following general election in January 1910. He was chosen as Liberal candidate for the 1912 Nottingham East by-election. This was a Conservative seat, however he managed to reduce the Unionist majority at the by-election. He switched back contest the new seat of Plymouth Drake at the 1918 election. However, the Coalition government endorsement went to his Tory opponent and he came second. He then switched to contest Croydon South, his own local constituency, in 1922, not a promising seat and finished in third place. He did not stand for parliament again.

Electoral record

References

External links
 

1853 births
1935 deaths
UK MPs 1906–1910
Liberal Party (UK) MPs for English constituencies
Members of the Parliament of the United Kingdom for Plymouth